Atlantica is a genus of snails in the family Gastrodontidae.

Species
The genus includes 12 species:
 Atlantica calathoides 
 Atlantica engonata  (synonyms: Helix engonata Shuttleworth, 1852 (protonym); Discus engonatus (Shuttleworth 1852)) 
 Atlantica ganoda 
 Atlantica gomerensis 
 Atlantica gueriniana 
 Atlantica kompsa 
 Atlantica laurisilvae 
 Atlantica putrescens 
 Atlantica retexta 
 Atlantica rupivaga 
 Atlantica scutula 
 Atlantica textilis

References

 Yanes, Yurena, Holyoak, Geraldine A., Holyoak, David T., Alonso, Maria R., Ibáñez, Miguel (2011): A new Discidae subgenus and two new species (Gastropoda: Pulmonata) from the Canary Islands. Zootaxa 2911: 43-49, DOI: 10.5281/zenodo.203498
 Bank, R. A. (2017). Classification of the Recent terrestrial Gastropoda of the World. Last update: July 16th, 2017
 Cameron, R. A. D., Holyoak, G. A., Holyoak, D. T., Yanes, Y., Alonso, M. R. & Ibáñez, M. (2013). Shell characters and genital anatomy of Atlantica calathoides and transfer of the genus Atlantica from Discidae to Gastrodontidae (Gastropoda: Pulmonata ). Journal of Conchology. 41 (3): 287-293

Discidae
Taxa named by César Marie Félix Ancey
Gastropod genera